Synthetic replication was first introduced in Europe in 2001. Synthetic replication is done through a type of exchange traded fund (ETF). An important attribute of this specific type of fund is that it does not hold any underlying securities featured on its benchmark. Instead of holding these securities synthetic ETF’s use derivatives such as swaps to track the underlying index in the process of replication. In replication of these synthetic accounts the return is 100% tied to the ETF it represents. Therefore, the ETF “replicates” the fund's it is tied to performance. In this process the ETF manager enters a swap contract with an investment bank that agrees to pay the index return in exchange for a small fee.

Benefits and Drawbacks 
The biggest argued benefit of synthetic ETFS is that they seem to do a more accurate job of tracking indexes, and when used in full replication can allow for less risk/higher return investments. Those that argue against synthetic replication says that it adds counterparty risk, is not fully transparent, and could mislead less experienced investors.

Example 
For instance Black–Scholes theory claims vanilla option pricing can be achieved through the use of stock and zero-coupon bond. A simple example would be if you went to a bank and purchased a synthetic ETF for the purpose of replication. That fund may represent a certain group of stocks in Apple. However, the synthetic ETF is in no way physically attached to Apples stock. The bank you purchased the fund from would largely mirror Apples stock performance 100%  through the use of derivatives and swaps in the process of replication and would charge you a fee for it. This is an extremely simple example but does describe the base process of synthetic replication.

List of Synthetic Exchange Traded Funds (ETFs) 

Amundi ETF MSCI EMU High Dividend UCITS ETF EUR (C)
Amundi ETF MSCI Europe Banks UCITS ETF EUR (C)
Amundi ETF MSCI Europe Energy UCITS ETF EUR (C)
Amundi ETF MSCI Europe Healthcare UCITS ETF EUR (C)
Amundi ETF MSCI Europe ex EMU UCITS ETF EUR (C)
Amundi ETF MSCI France UCITS ETF
Amundi ETF MSCI Spain UCITS ETF EUR (C)
Amundi ETF MSCI UK UCITS ETF EUR (C)
Amundi ETF MSCI World ex EMU UCITS ETF EUR (C)
Amundi ETF STOXX Europe 50 UCITS ETF EUR (C)
Amundi MSCI Emerging Markets UCITS ETF EUR (C)
BNP Paribas Easy S&P GSCI Energy & Metals Capped Component UCITS ETF A USD
Comstage Australia (S&P/ASX 200) UCITS ETF - Dist
Comstage Bloomberg Equal-weight Commodity ex-Agriculture UCITS ETF
Comstage China Enterprise (HSCEI) UCITS ETF - Acc
Comstage Commodities Refinitiv/CoreCommodity CRB TR UCITS ETF - Acc
Comstage Commodities Refinitiv/CoreCommodity CRB EX-Energy TR UCITS ETF - Acc
Comstage DJ Global Titans 50 UCITS ETF - Dist
Comstage Dow Jones Industrial Average UCITS ETF - Dist
Comstage Euro Overnight Return UCITS ETF - Acc
Comstage FTSE 100 UCITS ETF - Acc
Comstage iBoxx GBP Liquid Corporates Long Dated UCITS ETF - Dist
Comstage iBoxx USD Liquid Emerging Markets Sovereigns UCITS ETF - Dist
Comstage MSCI AC Asia Pacific Ex Japan UCITS ETF - Acc
Comstage MSCI All Country World UCITS ETF - Acc (USD)
Comstage MSCI Brazil UCITS ETF - Acc
Comstage MSCI Eastern Europe ex Russia UCITS ETF - Acc
Comstage MSCI Emerging Markets (LUX) UCITS ETF
Comstage MSCI Emerging Markets UCITS ETF - Acc EUR
Comstage MSCI Emerging Markets UCITS ETF - Acc USD
Comstage MSCI EM Latin America UCITS ETF - Acc
Comstage MSCI India UCITS ETF - Acc (USD)
Comstage MSCI Korea UCITS ETF - Acc
Comstage MSCI Russia UCITS ETF - Dist
Comstage MSCI Taiwan UCITS ETF - Acc
Comstage MSCI Turkey UCITS ETF - Acc
Comstage MSCI USA UCITS ETF - Dist
Comstage MSCI World Consumer Discretionary TR UCITS ETF - Acc (USD)
Comstage MSCI World Consumer Staples TR UCITS ETF - Acc (USD)
Comstage MSCI World Energy TR UCITS ETF - Acc (USD)
Comstage MSCI World Financials TR UCITS ETF - Acc (USD)
Comstage MSCI World Health Care TR UCITS ETF - Acc (USD)
Comstage MSCI World Industrials TR UCITS ETF - Acc (USD)
Comstage MSCI World Information Technology TR UCITS ETF - Acc (USD)
Comstage MSCI World Materials TR UCITS ETF - Acc (USD)
Comstage MSCI World Telecommunication Services TR UCITS ETF - Acc (USD)
Comstage MSCI World Utilities TR UCITS ETF - Acc (USD)
Comstage Nasdaq-100 UCITS ETF - Acc
Comstage Russell 1000 Growth UCITS ETF - Acc
Comstage SG Global Quality Income NTR UCITS ETF - Acc
Comstage SG Global Quality Income NTR UCITS ETF - Dist
Comstage S&P 500 UCITS ETF - Dist (USD)
CS ETF (IE) on CSI 300
CS ETF (IE) on EONIA
CS ETF (IE) on Fed Funds Effective Rate
CS ETF (IE) on MSCI EM EMEA
CS ETF (IE) on MSCI India
CS ETF (IE) on MSCI Taiwan
Invesco Commodity Composite UCITS ETF Acc
Invesco European Autos Sector UCITS ETF
Invesco European Banks Sector UCITS ETF
Invesco European Basic Resources Sector UCITS ETF
Invesco European Chemicals Sector UCITS ETF
Invesco European Construction Sector UCITS ETF
Invesco European Financials Sector UCITS ETF
Invesco European Food & Bev Sector UCITS ETF
Invesco European Health Care Sector UCITS ETF
Invesco European Household Sector UCITS ETF
Invesco European Industrials Sector UCITS ETF Acc
Invesco European Insurance Sector UCITS ETF Acc
Invesco European Media Sector UCITS ETF
Invesco European Oil & Gas Sector UCITS ETF
Invesco European Retail Sector UCITS ETF
Invesco European Technology Sector UCITS ETF
Invesco European Telecoms Sector UCITS ETF
Invesco European Travel Sector UCITS ETF
Invesco European Utilities Sector UCITS ETF
Invesco EURO STOXX 50 UCITS ETF
Invesco EURO STOXX 50 UCITS ETF Dist
Invesco EURO STOXX Optimised Banks UCITS ETF
Invesco FTSE 100 UCITS ETF
Invesco FTSE 250 UCITS ETF
Invesco Morningstar US Energy Infrastructure MLP UCITS ETF Acc
Invesco Morningstar US Energy Infrastructure MLP UCITS ETF Dist
Invesco MSCI Emerging Markets UCITS ETF
Invesco MSCI Europe UCITS ETF
Invesco MSCI Europe Value UCITS ETF
Invesco MSCI Japan UCITS ETF
Invesco MSCI USA UCITS ETF
Invesco MSCI World UCITS ETF
Invesco Russell 2000 UCITS ETF
Invesco RDX UCITS ETF
Invesco S&P 500 UCITS ETF
Invesco STOXX Europe 600 UCITS ETF
Invesco STOXX Europe Mid 200 UCITS ETF
Invesco STOXX Europe Small 200 UCITS ETF

Invesco US Consumer Discretionary Sector UCITS ETF
Invesco US Consumer Staples Sector UCITS ETF
Invesco US Energy Sector UCITS ETF
Invesco US Financials Sector UCITS ETF
Invesco US Health Care Sector UCITS ETF
Invesco US Industrials Sector UCITS ETF
Invesco US Materials Sector UCITS ETF
Invesco US Technology Sector UCITS ETF
Invesco US Utilities Sector UCITS ETF
iShares Diversified Commodity Swap UCITS ETF (DE)
L&G DAX Daily 2x Long UCITS ETF
L&G DAX Daily 2x Short UCITS ETF
L&G FTSE 100 Leveraged (Daily 2x) UCITS ETF
L&G FTSE 100 Super Short Strategy (Daily 2x) UCITS ETF
L&G Longer Dated All Commodities UCITS ETF
Lyxor BTP Daily (-2x) Inverse UCITS ETF - Acc
Lyxor Bund Daily (-2x) Inverse UCITS ETF - Acc
Lyxor Bund Future Daily (-1x) Inverse UCITS ETF
Lyxor CAC 40 Daily (-1x) Inverse UCITS ETF - Acc
Lyxor CAC 40 Daily (2x) Leveraged UCITS ETF - Acc
Lyxor China Enterprise (HSCEI) UCITS ETF USD
Lyxor Daily LevDAX UCITS ETF - Acc
Lyxor Daily ShortDAX x2 UCITS ETF - Acc
Lyxor EuroMTS Covered Bond Aggregate UCITS ETF - Dist
Lyxor EURO STOXX 50 Daily (-1x) Inverse UCITS ETF - Acc
Lyxor EURO STOXX 50 Daily (-2x) Inverse UCITS ETF - Acc
Lyxor FTSE EPRA/NAREIT Global Developed UCITS ETF - Dist (EUR)
Lyxor FTSE EPRA/NAREIT Global Developed UCITS ETF - Dist (USD)
Lyxor FTSE MIB Daily (-2x) Inverse (Xbear) UCITS ETF - Acc
Lyxor Hong Kong (HSI) UCITS ETF - Dist
Lyxor IBEX 35 Doble Inverso Diario UCITS ETF - Acc
Lyxor MSCI AC Asia Pacific Ex Japan UCITS ETF USD
Lyxor MSCI AC Asia Ex Japan UCITS ETF - Acc
Lyxor MSCI All Country World UCITS ETF - Acc (EUR)
Lyxor MSCI Greece UCITS ETF - Dist
Lyxor MSCI India UCITS ETF - Acc (EUR)
Lyxor MSCI Indonesia UCITS ETF - Acc
Lyxor MSCI Russia UCITS ETF - Acc
Lyxor MSCI USA UCITS ETF - Acc
Lyxor MSCI World UCITS ETF - Dist
Lyxor MSCI World Communication Services TR UCITS ETF - Acc (EUR)
Lyxor MSCI World Consumer Discretionary TR UCITS ETF - Acc (EUR)
Lyxor MSCI World Consumer Staples TR UCITS ETF - Acc (EUR)
Lyxor MSCI World Energy TR UCITS ETF - Acc (EUR)
Lyxor MSCI World Financials TR UCITS ETF - Acc (EUR)
Lyxor MSCI World Health Care TR UCITS ETF - Acc (EUR)
Lyxor MSCI World Industrials TR UCITS ETF - Acc (EUR)
Lyxor MSCI World Information Technology TR UCITS ETF - Acc (EUR)
Lyxor MSCI World Materials TR UCITS ETF - Acc (EUR)
Lyxor MSCI World Utilities TR UCITS ETF - Acc (EUR)
Lyxor Pan Africa UCITS ETF - Acc
Lyxor S&P 500 VIX Futures Enhanced Roll UCITS ETF - Acc
Lyxor S&P 500 UCITS ETF - Dist (EUR)
Lyxor S&P 500 UCITS ETF - Daily Hedged to EUR - Dist
Lyxor STOXX Europe 600 Automobiles & Parts UCITS ETF - Acc
Lyxor STOXX Europe 600 Banks UCITS ETF - Acc
Lyxor STOXX Europe 600 Basic Resources UCITS ETF - Acc
Lyxor STOXX Europe 600 Chemicals UCITS ETF - Acc
Lyxor STOXX Europe 600 Construction & Materials UCITS ETF - Acc
Lyxor STOXX Europe 600 Financial Services UCITS ETF - Acc
Lyxor STOXX Europe 600 Food & Beverage UCITS ETF - Acc
Lyxor STOXX Europe 600 Healthcare UCITS ETF - Acc
Lyxor STOXX Europe 600 Industrial Goods & Services UCITS ETF - Acc
Lyxor STOXX Europe 600 Insurance UCITS ETF - Acc
Lyxor STOXX Europe 600 Media UCITS ETF - Acc
Lyxor STOXX Europe 600 Oil & Gas UCITS ETF - Acc
Lyxor STOXX Europe 600 Personal & Household Goods UCITS ETF - Acc
Lyxor STOXX Europe 600 Real Estate UCITS ETF - Dist
Lyxor STOXX Europe 600 Retail UCITS ETF - Acc
Lyxor STOXX Europe 600 Technology UCITS ETF - Acc
Lyxor STOXX Europe 600 Telecommunications UCITS ETF - Acc
Lyxor STOXX Europe 600 Travel & Leisure UCITS ETF - Acc
Lyxor STOXX Europe 600 Utilities UCITS ETF - Acc
Lyxor STOXX Europe Select Dividend 30 UCITS ETF - Dist

Market Access NYSE Arca Gold Bugs UCITS ETF
Market Access Rogers International Commodity UCITS ETF
Ossiam Emerging Markets Minimum Variance NR UCITS ETF 1C (USD)
Ossiam Europe ESG Machine Learning UCITS ETF 1C (EUR)
Ossiam Risk Weighted Enhanced Commodity Ex Grains TR UCITS ETF 1C (USD)
Ossiam STOXX Europe 600 Equal Weight NR UCITS ETF 1C (EUR)
UBS ETF (IE) Bloomberg Commodity Index SF UCITS ETF (CHF) A-acc
UBS ETF (IE) Bloomberg Commodity Index SF UCITS ETF (EUR) A-acc
UBS ETF (IE) Bloomberg Commodity Index SF UCITS ETF (GBP) A-acc
UBS ETF (IE) Bloomberg Commodity Index SF UCITS ETF (USD) A-acc
UBS ETF (IE) CMCI Composite SF UCITS ETF (hedged to CHF) A-acc
UBS ETF (IE) CMCI Composite SF UCITS ETF (hedged to EUR) A-acc
UBS ETF (IE) CMCI Composite SF UCITS ETF (USD) A-acc
UBS ETF (IE) MSCI AC Asia Ex Japan SF UCITS ETF (USD) A-acc
UBS ETF (IE) MSCI Emerging Markets SF UCITS ETF (USD) A-acc
UBS ETF (IE) MSCI USA SF UCITS ETF (USD) A-acc
UBS ETF (IE) S&P 500 SF UCITS ETF (USD) A-acc
Xtrackers II EUR Overnight Rate Swap UCITS ETF 1C
Xtrackers II EUR Overnight Rate Swap UCITS ETF 1D
Xtrackers II Eurozone AAA Government Bond Swap UCITS ETF 1D
Xtrackers CSI 300 Swap UCITS ETF 1C
Xtrackers DB Bloomberg Commodity Optimum Yield Swap UCITS ETF 2C EUR hedged
Xtrackers DBLCI Commodity Optimum Yield Swap UCITS ETF 1C EUR hedged
Xtrackers DBLCI Commodity Optimum Yield Swap UCITS ETF 3C GBP hedged
Xtrackers DBLCI Commodity Optimum Yield Swap UCITS ETF USD Hedged
Xtrackers EUR Liquid Corporate 12.5 Swap UCITS ETF 1C
Xtrackers EURO STOXX 50 Short Daily Swap UCITS ETF 1C
Xtrackers Fed Funds Effective Rate Swap UCITS ETF 1C
Xtrackers FTSE 100 Short Daily Swap UCITS ETF 1C
Xtrackers FTSE Vietnam Swap UCITS ETF 1C
Xtrackers iBoxx EUR Liquid Covered Swap UCITS ETF 1C
Xtrackers iBoxx Germany Covered Swap UCITS ETF 1C
Xtrackers iBoxx Germany Covered Swap UCITS ETF 1D
Xtrackers iBoxx Sovereigns Eurozone AAA Swap UCITS ETF 1C
Xtrackers iTraxx Crossover Short Daily Swap UCITS ETF 1C
Xtrackers iTraxx Crossover Swap UCITS ETF 1C
Xtrackers iTraxx Europe Swap UCITS ETF 1C
Xtrackers LevDAX Daily Swap UCITS ETF 1C
Xtrackers LPX MM Private Equity Swap UCITS ETF 1C
Xtrackers MSCI AC Asia ex Japan Swap UCITS ETF 1C
Xtrackers MSCI EFM Africa Top 50 Capped Swap UCITS ETF 1C
Xtrackers MSCI Emerging Markets Swap UCITS ETF 1C
Xtrackers MSCI EM Asia Swap UCITS ETF 1C
Xtrackers MSCI EM EMEA Swap UCITS ETF 1C
Xtrackers MSCI EM Latin America Swap UCITS ETF 1C
Xtrackers MSCI India Swap UCITS ETF 1C
Xtrackers MSCI Indonesia Swap UCITS ETF
Xtrackers MSCI Indonesia Swap UCITS ETF 1C
Xtrackers MSCI Pakistan Swap UCITS ETF 1C
Xtrackers MSCI Russia Capped Swap UCITS ETF 1C
Xtrackers MSCI Russia Capped Swap UCITS ETF 2D
Xtrackers MSCI USA Swap UCITS ETF 1C
Xtrackers MSCI World Swap UCITS ETF 1C
Xtrackers MSCI World Swap UCITS ETF 2C
Xtrackers MSCI World Swap UCITS ETF 4C EUR hedged
Xtrackers MTS Ex-Bank of Italy BOT Swap UCITS ETF 1C
Xtrackers Nifty 50 Swap UCITS ETF 1C
Xtrackers ShortDAX Daily Swap UCITS ETF 1C
Xtrackers ShortDAX x2 Daily Swap UCITS ETF 1C
Xtrackers Short iBoxx EUR Sovereigns Eurozone Daily Swap UCITS ETF 1C
Xtrackers S&P 500 2x Inverse Daily Swap UCITS ETF 1C
Xtrackers S&P 500 2x Leveraged Daily Swap UCITS ETF 1C
Xtrackers S&P 500 Inverse Daily Swap UCITS ETF 1C
Xtrackers S&P 500 Swap UCITS ETF 1C
Xtrackers S&P Global Infrastructure Swap UCITS ETF 1C
Xtrackers S&P Select Frontier Swap UCITS ETF 1C
Xtrackers Sterling Cash Swap UCITS ETF 1D
Xtrackers STOXX Europe 600 Banks Swap UCITS ETF 1C
Xtrackers STOXX Europe 600 Basic Resources Swap UCITS ETF 1C
Xtrackers STOXX Europe 600 Food & Beverage Swap UCITS ETF 1C
Xtrackers STOXX Europe 600 Health Care Swap UCITS ETF 1C
Xtrackers STOXX Europe 600 Industrial Goods Swap UCITS ETF 1C
Xtrackers STOXX Europe 600 Oil & Gas Swap UCITS ETF 1C
Xtrackers STOXX Europe 600 Technology Swap UCITS ETF 1C
Xtrackers STOXX Europe 600 Telecommunications Swap UCITS ETF 1C
Xtrackers STOXX Europe 600 Utilities Swap UCITS ETF 1C
Xtrackers STOXX Global Select Dividend 100 Swap UCITS ETF 1D
Xtrackers USD Overnight Rate Swap UCITS ETF 1C

References

Financial markets